Senator Cravens may refer to:

James A. Cravens (1818–1893), Indiana State Senate
John R. Cravens (1819–1899), Indiana State Senate
Jordan E. Cravens (1830–1914), Arkansas State Senate

See also
Margaret Craven (politician) (born 1944), Maine State Senate
Don Cravins Jr. (born 1972), Louisiana State Senate